Lyrocarpa is a genus of flowering plants belonging to the family Brassicaceae.

Its native range is Southwestern USA to Northwestern Mexico.

Species:

Lyrocarpa coulteri 
Lyrocarpa linearifolia 
Lyrocarpa xanti

References

Brassicaceae
Brassicaceae genera